is a Japanese professional baseball Pitcher for the Fukuoka SoftBank Hawks of Nippon Professional Baseball.

Professional career
On October 17, 2019, Ohzeki was drafted as a developmental player by the Fukuoka SoftBank Hawks in the 2019 Nippon Professional Baseball draft.

In 2020 season, he played in informal matches against the Shikoku Island League Plus's teams and amateur baseball teams, and played in the Western League of NPB second league.

On May 28, 2021, Ohzeki re-signed a 8 million yen contract with the Fukuoka SoftBank Hawks as a registered player under control. On June 4, he made his debut as a relief pitcher in the Interleague play against the Hanshin Tigers. In 2021 season, he finished the regular season with 12 Games pitched, a 0–0 Win–loss record, a 2.35 ERA, and a 13 strikeouts in 23 innings.

On March 31, 2022, Ohzeki pitched as a starting pitcher against the Chiba Lotte Marines and recorded his first win. On July 26, he participated the All-Star Game for the first time in My Navi All-Star Game 2022. Ohzeki was pitched as a starting pitcher from the opening, but on August 2, it was announced that he had undergone surgery to remove a tumor on his testicle, and he was recuperating. He is in good condition after surgery, and he pitched on September 25 for the first time in two months. In 2022 season, he finished the regular season with 21 Games pitched, a 7–6 Win–loss record, a 2.93 ERA, and a 70 strikeouts in 101.1 innings.

References

External links

 Career statistics - NPB.jp
 42 Tomohisa Ohzeki PLAYERS2022 - Fukuoka SoftBank Hawks Official site

1997 births
Living people
Fukuoka SoftBank Hawks players
Japanese baseball players
Nippon Professional Baseball pitchers
Baseball people from Ibaraki Prefecture